Vasantha Lakshmi is a 1978 Indian Kannada-language film, directed by A. V. Seshagiri Rao and produced by K. Vittala Kumar, K. V. Honnappa and K. V. Gurunath. The film stars Srinath, Aarathi, Vishnuvardhan and Manjula. The film has musical score by Vijaya Bhaskar. The movie is a remake of the 1974 Tamil movie Engamma Sapatham.

Cast

Srinath
Aarathi as Vasantha 
Vishnuvardhan as Chandru
Manjula as Lakshmi
M. P. Shankar as Kalingayya
Leelavathi
Pandari Bai as Annapoorna
B. V. Radha
Jayamalini
B. Jaya
Baby Indira as Young Lakshmi 
Baby Raasi as Young Vasantha 
Naveena
K. S. Ashwath as Narayanappa
Vajramuni
Dwarakish
Thoogudeepa Srinivas as Rowdy Chenayya
Dinesh
Tiger Prabhakar
M. S. Sathya
Ashwatha Narayana
Jr. Shetty
Comedian Guggu
M. S. Umesh
Balakrishna
Narasimharaju
Shivaram

Soundtrack
The music was composed by Vijaya Bhaskar. The song Belli Modave reused the tune of the song Anbu Megame  from the original version Engamma Sapatham which also had music composed by Vijaya Bhaskar.

References

External links
 

1978 films
1970s Kannada-language films
Films scored by Vijaya Bhaskar
Films directed by A. V. Seshagiri Rao